Zsolt Kézdi-Kovács (1 June 1936 – 7 September 2014) was a Hungarian film director and screenwriter. He directed 19 films between 1961 and 2004. His film Forbidden Relations was entered into competition at the 1983 Cannes Film Festival.

Selected filmography
Story of a Coward (Short 1966)
Temperate Zone (Mérsékelt Égöv) (1970)
Romanticism (1972)
A locsolókocsi (1973)
When Joseph Returns (1976)
A Nice Neighbor (1979)
A remény joga (1982)
Forbidden Relations (1983)
Rejtőzködő (1986)
Kiáltás és kiáltás (1988)
És mégis (1991)
Az a nap a mienk (Documentary 2002)

References

External links

1936 births
2014 deaths
Hungarian film directors
Hungarian screenwriters
Male screenwriters
Hungarian male writers